Jhangar or Jhanger is a village in the Rajouri district of Indian-administered Jammu and Kashmir, close to the Line of Control that divides the Indian and Pakistan-administered portions of Kashmir.

History 
Prior to 1947, Jhangar was the base of the Mirpur–Poonch Brigade of the State Forces of the princely state of Jammu and Kashmir. It was at a strategic location that was roughly equidistant from the towns of Bhimber, Mirpur, Kotli and Rajouri. It was fiercely contesed between the Indian and Pakistani forces during the Indo-Pakistani War of 1947–1948, eventually coming under Indian control. The village faces frequent shelling from Pakistan.

References

Bibliography 
 
 
  
 
 

Villages in Rajouri district
India–Pakistan border